The Schwarzhorn  is a mountain of the Bernese Alps, located between Brienz and Grindelwald in the Bernese Oberland. With a height of 2,928 metres above sea level, it is the highest summit of the group north of the Grosse Scheidegg Pass. The Schwarzhorn is also the highest point in the municipality of Brienz.

A small glacier named Blau Gletscherli lies on the north side of the mountain.

The Schwarzhorn is regarded as one of the most stunning look-out peaks in the Bernese Oberland. Its summit can be accessed by a trail on the southern ridge.

References

External links
 Schwarzhorn on Hikr

Bernese Alps
Mountains of the Alps
Mountains of Switzerland
Mountains of the canton of Bern
Two-thousanders of Switzerland